Jossie Esteban y la Patrulla 15 is a leading Merengue band from Dominican Republic, formed by Jossie Esteban (born Esteban Grullón) and Alberto Martínez (known as Ringo).

The group was formed by these Dominican childhood friends in May 1979. Its musicians were predominantly Dominicans but also included some  Puerto Ricans.  Their debut album El Cuchu Cu Cha was a hit, and  since then they have recorded more than 20 records, winning awards such as “the gold congo” in Colombia, “orchestra of the year” in New York,  and a number of platinum discs.  Some of their hit songs are "Agua de Coco" (Coconut Water), "Pirulo", "El Can" (The Party), "Un hombre busca una mujer" (a man looks for a woman), "Enamoraito" (love-struck) etc. 

Since 1992 Jossie Esteban has also been part of the successful Merengue group, Zona Roja.

Musicians of La Patrulla 15
 Esteban Grullon "Jossie Esteban" (1975–1998) Vocals, Songwriter, Arranger & Chorus.
 Alberto Martinez "Ringo" (1975–1998) Piano, Songwriter, Arranger & Chorus.
 Euripides González Feliz ( júnior)(1978–1983) Saxophone, Songwriter & Arranger.
 Henry Hierro - Arranger, Bajo (1975 - 1977) 
 Willie Hierro - Cantante (1975 - 1977)
 Edgar Cedeño (1978–1998) Saxophone & Arranger.
 Carlos Peña (1984–1998) Saxophone & Arranger.
 Nelson Garcia (1980) Trompet & Arranger.
 Arelis Peguero (1978–1998) Trompet.
 Alfonso Quesada (1978–1985) Tambora, Campana, Clave & Redoblante.
 Rafael "Juni" Brito – Tambora
 Felix Suero – Guira
 Nez Cafe – Conga
 Heriberto Picart – Bajo
 Salvador Lamourt (1978–1998) Trombone.
 Eddie Gomez – Bajo
 Romualdo Tatis – Guira
 Elias Lopes – Trompet
 Hernesto "Chiriki" Henriquez – Trompet
 Juan Mejias – Guira & Bombo
 Jackie Lera – Congas
 Angel Vazquez – Bajo
 Rey Mundi – Trombone
 Caffe Cruz – Congas
 Daniel Peña – Saxophone (only in 1983 songs "ay si, ay no" & "deja ese diablo")
 Jose Rolando Tatis – Guira
 Freddy Miranda – Saxophone
 Nelson "Brigi" Ruiz – Tambora, Bateria & Bombo
 Elias Santana – Flujel (invited only for the song "Viviras")
 Reynaldo Torres – Trompet
 Miguel Rodriguez – Trompet
 Benny Marin – Saxophone
 Alcides Gil – Conga
 Carlos Aviles – Trompet
 Alfredo Torres – Trombone
 Ysrael Casado – Piano
 Cheo Quiñones – Chorus
 William Berrios – Vocals & Chorus
 Tony Ramirez – Vocals & Chorus
 Martin Martinez – Vocals, Songwriter & Chorus
 Alfred Cotto – Chorus

Discography of La Patrulla 15

External links 
 Allmusic.com page on Jossie Esteban y la Patrulla 15 
 Platano Records page

Dominican Republic musical groups
Merengue music groups